Ponchatoula is the second-largest city in Tangipahoa Parish, Louisiana. The population was 6,559 at the 2010 census and 7,545 at the time of the 2020 population estimates program.

Etymology
It is speculated that the name is derived from the Choctaw  words Pashi meaning "hair" and perhaps itula or itola meaning "to fall" or "to hang" or "flowing" in the Choctaw language

History

William Akers
Ponchatoula was originally established as a small fishing village around 1820. Then in the year 1839 a man named William Akers moved into town and purchased over 1,000 acres from the United States Federal Government. William began farming and harvesting the local virgin pine timber and pulling the logs to a nearby sawmill with teams of oxen. According to some sources William Akers had several Native Americans working in his timber crew and they provided the name Ponchatoula. It was the Native American way of expressing the beauty of the location, with beautiful Spanish moss hanging from the large oak trees.

As more settlers arrived in the area William began selling his land to those families. Then on February 12, 1861, Ponchatoula incorporated as a town. William Akers was appointed as the first mayor and is credited with founding the town. In the 1880s Akers reported that he had sold nearly 700 acres of land and only had about 300 acres of land remaining.  He was a leader in the Temperance movement and fought hard to keep alcoholic beverages out of Ponchatoula. He was also a member of the local Masonic Lodge and was very active in the Methodist Episcopal Church.

Early 20th century

The train depot which was destroyed during the Civil War was rebuilt in 1895 as the area began to recover from the Civil War. At the turn of the 20th century Ponchatoula began to transform from the lumber industry into a commercial farming community. The main street began filling up with beautiful brick buildings as shops, banks and restaurants were built to accommodate the growing population. The main crop grown by the local farmers was the strawberry. Many of the families who were major farmers during this era, which lasted about eighty years, have their last names engraved on a large plaque in front of city hall.

Geography

Ponchatoula is located along Interstate 55 and Louisiana Highway 22, equidistant from New Orleans and Baton Rouge. In the early 1900s, Ponchatoula was one of only two ways to reach New Orleans by land, thus earning the moniker "Gateway to New Orleans."

Demographics

2020 census

As of the 2020 United States census, there were 7,822 people, 2,863 households, and 1,726 families residing in the city.

2000 census
As of the 2000 census, there were 5,180 people, 1,984 households, and 1,372 families residing in the city. The racial makeup of the city was 62.20% White, 36.83% African American, 0.19% Native American, 0.12% Asian, 0.15% from other races, and 0.50% from two or more races. Hispanic or Latino of any race were 0.85% of the population.

There were 1,984 households, out of which 34.9% had children under the age of 18 living with them, 41.2% were married couples living together, 23.1% had a female householder with no husband present, and 30.8% were non-families. 27.1% of all households were made up of individuals, and 11.5% had someone living alone who was 65 years of age or older. The average household size was 2.60 and the average family size was 3.16.

In the city, the population was spread out, with 29.8% under the age of 18, 9.9% from 18 to 24, 26.9% from 25 to 44, 21.0% from 45 to 64, and 12.4% who were 65 years of age or older. The median age was 33 years.  For every 100 females, there were 85.9 males. For every 100 females age 18 and over, there were 79.1 males.

The median income for a household in the city was $22,244, and the median income for a family was $29,583. Males had a median income of $30,285 versus $18,952 for females. The per capita income for the city was $12,157. About 27.9% of families and 31.7% of the population were below the poverty line, including 46.9% of those under age 18 and 15.1% of those age 65 or over.

Education
Tangipahoa Parish School System operates public schools:
Ponchatoula High School (near Ponchatoula)
Ponchatoula Junior High School
Martha Vineyard Elementary School (near Ponchatoula)
D. C. Reeves Elementary School
Tucker Elementary School
Perrin Early Learning Center

Visitor attractions

Ponchatoula hosts Louisiana's Strawberry Festival each April and an Oktoberfest each autumn.

The town is noted for its many antique shops along Pine Street (LA 22), open year-round. Eleven of the Ponchatoula Commercial Historic District buildings are determined to be historically significant and listed on the National Register of Historic Places. Ponchatoula is small, but it has a number of attractions including a sign on the outskirts of town with how many miles it lies from South Dakota's Wall Drug store.

Across Highway 22 from Hardhide is the Collinswood School Museum, a former one-room schoolhouse which exhibits local artifacts and quilts. Between the school museum and the tracks stands the Strawberry Train, which is a steam engine and single passenger car roped off in such a way that children can safely climb into the engine and the car.

The Chamber of Commerce office is located on Highway 22 at the railroad tracks and has information about these and other sights in Ponchatoula and the surrounding area.

Strawberry Festival
The first Strawberry Festival was held in April 1972 on the first block of North 6th Street and was co-sponsored by the Ponchatoula Jaycees and the Ponchatoula Chamber of Commerce.  The first festival was small and only had 11 booths. It was a two-day event beginning with a baseball game between Southeastern Louisiana University and Wisconsin State. Today it is the second largest event in the state, after Mardi Gras. During the 1980s the local economy changed to tourism, when farming no longer earned enough to sustain the town. The mayor at the time devised a plan to open antique shops where former businesses had been located. There are still about six of these shops in operation. This gave the town a second nickname, "America's Antique City."

Notable people
Irwin Davis, football player, coach, and administrator
Dennis Paul Hebert Sr., state representative for Tangipahoa Parish, 1972-1996
Michael I. Jordan, researcher in Machine Learning and Artificial Intelligence 
Steve Pugh, politician and florist, member of the Louisiana House of Representatives (2008–2020) 
Trevante Rhodes, actor, sprinter
Bernie Smith, baseball player
Tyjae Spears, football player
Irma Thomas, singer
Reggie Walker, football player
Earl Wilson, baseball player

See also
Hammond, Louisiana
Manchac, Louisiana
Ponchatoula High School
Ponchatoula Creek
USS Ponchatoula (AOG-38)
USNS Ponchatoula (T-AO-148)

References

External links
 City of Ponchatoula - Official Website of the City of Ponchatoula, LA
 The Ponchatoula Times
 Ponchatoula Chamber of Commerce
 Ponchatoula Strawberry Festival
 MyHammond–MyPonchatoula directory

Cities in Louisiana
Louisiana African American Heritage Trail
Populated places established in 1820
1820 establishments in Louisiana
Cities in Tangipahoa Parish, Louisiana
List of place names of Choctaw origin in the United States